Jennifer Lombardi (born in Hermosa Beach, California) is a female beach volleyball player from the United States who participated at the NORCECA Circuit 2009 at Cayman Islands playing with Jennifer Sharp. They finished in the 8th position.

References

External links
 
 title=AVP Profile 

Year of birth missing (living people)
Living people
American women's beach volleyball players
21st-century American women